A by-election for the constituency of Glasgow Gorbals in the United Kingdom House of Commons was held on 30 September 1948, caused by the appointment as Chair of the National Assistance Board of the incumbent Labour MP George Buchanan. The result was a hold for the Labour Party, with their candidate Alice Cullen.

Result

Previous election

References

 Craig, F. W. S. (1983) [1969]. British parliamentary election results 1918-1949 (3rd edition ed.). Chichester: Parliamentary Research Services. . 
 

Glasgow Gorbals by-election
Glasgow Gorbals by-election
Glasgow Gorbals by-election, 1948
Gorbals by-election, 1948
Glasgow Gorbals by-election
Gorbals, 1948